A  ratter is any dog used for catching and killing rats and similar vermin. Specialised rat-catching breeds are found in many countries. A typical ratter is small to medium-sized and has a short and smooth coat.

History 

The Guinness Book of World Records lists as the "fastest canine rat catcher" a bull-and-terrier dog named Billy, who killed 100 rats in 5 minutes 30 seconds (average of one rat every 3.3 seconds) at an event in 1825. Guinness also credits Billy with having killed 4000 rats within a 17-hour period (average of one rat every 15.3 seconds) on an unspecified occasion; other sources, including the 1993 edition of Atlas of Dog Breeds of the World, credit him with killing 2501 rats within a 7-hour period (average of one rat every 10 seconds).

Ratter breeds 

Among the many breeds used for ratting are several terriers, various pinschers and schnauzers, and the  breeds of Spain.

Rat terriers 
Among the terrier breeds often used as ratters are:
 the American Hairless Terrier
 the Brazilian Terrier
 the Chilean Fox Terrier
 the Manchester Terrier
 the Miniature Fox Terrier
 the Plummer Terrier
 the Rat Terrier
 the Teddy Roosevelt Terrier
 the Tenterfield Terrier
 the Jack Russell Terrier

Ratoneros 
There are five regional breeds of ratonero or ratter in Spain:
 the Ratonero Bodeguero Andaluz from Andalusia
 the Ca Rater Mallorquí or Ratonero Mallorquín of Mallorca
 the Ratonero Murciano from Murcia
 the Gos Rater Valencià or Ratonero Valenciano of Valencia
 the Villanuco de Las Encartaciones in the Basque Country

Pinschers and Schnauzers 

Dogs of pinscher and schnauzer type were traditionally used to catch rats; modern breeds derived from those include:
 the Affenpinscher
 the Austrian Pinscher
 the German Pinscher
 the Miniature Pinscher
 the Miniature Schnauzer or Zwergschnauzer
 the Riesenschnauzer or Giant Schnauzer
 the Schnauzer or Mittelschnauzer

Other 
 the Brussels Griffon
 the Schipperke
 the Dutch Smoushond, Dutch Ratter
 the Pražský Krysařík, Prague Ratter

References 

Dog types